Mary Holland (born June 24, 1985) is an American actress, comedian, and writer.

Early life and education
Holland was born and raised in Galax, Virginia. She attended Interlochen Center for the Arts and earned a Bachelor of Fine Arts from Northern Illinois University.

Career 
After graduating from college, she began performing at the Upright Citizens Brigade Theatre. She is a cast member of UCB's flagship show Asssscat.

Holland is a member of the comedy improv group Wild Horses, along with Lauren Lapkus, Erin Whitehead, and Stephanie Allynne.

In 2015, Holland was cast in the Starz series Blunt Talk, playing Shelly Tinkle until the series' cancellation after two seasons. In 2016, she was cast in a recurring role on the HBO series Veep and in the film Unicorn Store. On February 28, 2017, Holland was cast in the ABC comedy pilot Household Name alongside Carol Burnett.

On July 26, 2020, Holland participated in the Sequester: Undercover Mini in which she played as the Lemon. All donations for Holland's participation went to the Black Trans Travel Fund. Also in 2020, she guest starred in the final episode of season ten of Curb Your Enthusiasm. In 2022 she portrayed principal Martha Reiser in Senior Year, a comedy movie produced by Rebel Wilson. The movie got generally negative reviews but Holland's performance was praised.

Filmography

Film

Television

References

External links

1985 births
21st-century American actresses
21st-century American comedians
Actresses from Virginia
American film actresses
American television actresses
American voice actresses
American women comedians
Comedians from Virginia
Interlochen Center for the Arts alumni
Living people
Northern Illinois University alumni
People from Galax, Virginia
Upright Citizens Brigade Theater performers